Adam Bryanbaum Wiltzie (born September 17, 1969, New York City, NY) is a composer and sound engineer based in Brussels, Belgium.

Early life

Wiltzie was born in New York City, NY. Originally a champion youth tennis player, a knee injury sustained when he was 16 ended his career. Wiltzie then moved to Austin, Texas, where he lived for 10 years, before moving to Europe.

Career
Wiltzie is best known for his work as a founder of seminal ambient classical projects Stars of the Lid, The Dead Texan, Aix Em Klemm and A Winged Victory for the Sullen. He scored A Winged Victory for the Sullen's 2021 album "Invisible Cities", the score to the critically acclaimed theater production directed by Leo Warner. 

He has also recorded, played with, and worked as a live sound engineer for artists such as The Flaming Lips, Mercury Rev, Labradford, Bedhead, The Bad Livers, Windsor for the Derby, Iron & Wine, Jóhann Jóhannsson, Hauschka and Sparklehorse.

He has written the original scores for several film and television productions including Salero, The Yellow Birds and Iris. He also collaborated with Jóhann Jóhannsson on his scores for The Theory of Everything and Arrival, and wrote two of the main themes with Dustin O'Halloran in the 2016 Oscar-nominated film Lion.

Discography
Solo
Travels in Constants Vol. 24 (Temporary Residence Limited, 2015) 

Stars of the Lid (with Brian McBride)

Sleepingdog (with Chantal Acda)
 Naked in a Clean Bed (Muze, 2006)
 Polar Life (Gizeh, 2008)
 With Our Heads in the Clouds and Our Hearts in the Fields (Gizeh, 2011)

Aix Em Klemm (with Robert Donne)
 Aix Em Klemm (Kranky, 2000)

The Dead Texan (with Christina Vantzou)
 The Dead Texan (Kranky, 2004)

A Winged Victory for the Sullen (with Dustin O'Halloran)
 A Winged Victory for the Sullen (Erased Tapes, 2011)
 Atomos VII [EP] (Kranky, 2014)
 Atomos (Erased Tapes, 2014)
 Iris (Erased Tapes, 2016)
 God's Own Country (2017)
 The Undivided Five (Ninja Tune, 2019)
 Invisible Cities (Artificial Pinearch Manufacturing, 2021)
Film Score Albums
 Salero (Erased Tapes, 2016)
American Woman (Artificial Pinearch Manufacturing, 2019)

Filmography
Films

Documentaries

Short Films

Television

References

External links
 

1969 births
Living people
American audio engineers
American male composers
21st-century American composers
Musicians from New York City
Ambient music groups
Minimalist composers
Engineers from New York City
21st-century American male musicians
People from McAllen, Texas
Erased Tapes Records artists
American expatriates in Belgium